William Atlee was an American politician. He served as the eleventh mayor of Lancaster, Pennsylvania from 1869 to 1871.

References

Mayors of Lancaster, Pennsylvania